Heinrich Scheller (3 August 1929 – 1 September 1957) was a Swiss rower who competed in the 1952 Summer Olympics. In 1952 he was a crew member of the Swiss boat that won the silver medal in the coxed four event. Scheller died in a plane crash in 1957.

References

1929 births
1957 deaths
Swiss male rowers
Olympic rowers of Switzerland
Rowers at the 1952 Summer Olympics
Olympic silver medalists for Switzerland
Olympic medalists in rowing
Medalists at the 1952 Summer Olympics
European Rowing Championships medalists
Victims of aviation accidents or incidents in 1957
Victims of aviation accidents or incidents in the United States
Accidental deaths in California